Nopal Beat Records is a record label and music collective, based in Guadalajara, Jalisco, Mexico. It specializes in a fusion of electronic music with various styles of Latin music (a style usually referred to as acid cabaret). The name comes from the traditional Mexican vegetable nopal (an opuntia cactus, present in the coat of arms of Mexico).

Nopal was founded in 1999 as an independent label.

Since 2002, it has been associated with EMI Music Publishing as a joint venture under an administration agreement.

Production
Nopal Beat Compilation: Acid Cabaret 1
Through French label Cyber Production:
Mexico Part 1
Mexico Part 2
 Sussie 4
Nopal Beat Compilation: Acid Cabaret 2

Associated musicians and groups
Shock Bukara
Fat Naked Lady
Sussie 4
Sweet Electra
Double Helix
Galapago
Axkan
Revolver
Luis Flores

References

1999 establishments in Mexico
Mexican electronic musical groups
Mexican record labels
Electronic music record labels
EMI